Homopus  is a genus of tiny tortoises in the family Testudinidae, endemic to southern Africa. Three species have been moved to the genus Chersobius.

Naming
As a group, these closely related species are commonly known in Europe and Africa as padlopers (originally meaning "path-walkers" in Afrikaans), due to their habit of making tiny pathways through vegetation. In other parts of the world, such as the United States, they are known as Cape tortoises.

Distribution
The genus is indigenous and endemic to South Africa.

Species
The genus contains these species:

Conservation and captivity
They are threatened by habitat destruction, traffic on roads, overgrazing, and poaching for the pet trade. Another threat comes from introduced species, such as domestic dogs and pigs.

Among the Homopus species,  H. areolatus adapts well to captivity, as their diets are not highly specialized. The others do not generally survive well in captivity unless some effort is made to supply them with their natural food, that is, endemic plants from the Cape/Karoo regions. Many are taken from their natural habitat each year, and subsequently die as a result, as they do not readily adapt to typical captive diets and environment change. However, they can be very hardy in captivity, and most problems with captive care are caused by faulty nutrition, high humidity, or bad husbandry.

References

 
Turtles of Africa
Reptiles of South Africa
Turtle genera
Taxa named by André Marie Constant Duméril
Taxa named by Gabriel Bibron
Taxonomy articles created by Polbot